Ezzat Atlasifar (24 June 1936 – 26 September 2021), known professionally as Siamak Atlasi, was an Iranian actor and film director.

Biography
Atlasi started his artistic career in 1964 through the Association of Speakers and made his film debut in 1971 by acting in the movie Rough Men directed by Saber Rahbar.

Despite being vaccinated, Atlasi died of COVID-19 on 26 September 2021.

Selected filmography
Ballad of Tara (1979)
A Man Without a Shadow (2019)

References

1936 births
2021 deaths
People from Urmia
Deaths from the COVID-19 pandemic in Iran
Iranian male film actors
Iranian male television actors
Iranian male voice actors
Iranian film directors